Abbey in itself denotes the Christian monastic community and its buildings, that is presided over by an abbot.

People
 Abbey (surname)
 Abbey (given name)

Places
 Abbey River, a river in England

Locations
Abbey (Barking and Dagenham ward)
Abbey (County Clare Civil Parish)
Abbey (Derby ward)
 Abbey, Devon, England
Abbey (Leicester ward)
Abbey (Lincoln ward)
Abbey (Merton ward), see List of electoral wards in Greater London
Abbey (Nuneaton and Bedworth ward)
Abbey (Reading ward)
Abbey, Renfrewshire
Abbey (Rushcliffe ward)
Abbey (Sandwell ward), ward in Sandwell
 Abbey, Saskatchewan, town in Canada
Abbey, Western Australia
 Westminster Abbey (UK Parliament constituency), a former UK Parliament constituency sometimes known as Abbey

Facilities and structures
 The Abbey, Annandale, a heritage home in Sydney, Australia
 The Abbey, Sutton Courtenay, a medieval manor house in Oxfordshire, England
 Abbey Road, London, site of Abbey Road Studios where The Beatles' Abbey Road was recorded
 Abbey Stadium, homeground for Cambridge United F.C.
 The Abbey (Daytona Beach, Florida), a historic site in Florida
 Neo-Gothic Fonthill Abbey, which was never an abbey
 Woburn Abbey, near Woburn, Bedfordshire, England, the seat of the Duke of Bedford and the location of the Woburn Safari Park

Organizations and companies

 The Abbey (club), a gay bar and nightclub in West Hollywood, California
 Abbey (coachbuilder), an English car body builder of the 1930s
 Abbey National, a former British bank, part of the Spanish banking group, Grupo Santander
 The Abbey Theatre, a Dublin theatre opened in 1904

Entertainment and media
 The Abbey (novel), science-fiction novel by the Romanian author Dan Doboș

Television
 The Abbey (documentary), a 1995 BBC TV documentary film on Westminster Abbey
 The Abbey, Australian version of The Monastery (TV series)
 The Abbey (TV series), 2007 ITV drama

Games
 Mystery of the Abbey, a board game
 Murder in the Abbey, a video game

Fictional abbeys
 Rabelais' Abbey of Thélème
 Downton Abbey
 Jane Austen's Northanger Abbey
 Redwall Abbey

Other uses
Abbey (1853), Australian ship
 Abbey (automobile), a short-lived British friction-drive car made by the defunct Abbey Auto Engineering Co. Ltd

See also
L' Abeye, Belgium
Abby (disambiguation)
Abey (name)